Ostrikovac is a village in the municipality of Ćuprija, Serbia. At the 2002 census, the village had a population of 574 people.

References

Populated places in Pomoravlje District